Matthew 25, the twenty-fifth chapter of the Gospel of Matthew, continues the Olivet Discourse or "Little Apocalypse" spoken by Jesus Christ, also described as the Eschatological Discourse, which had started in chapter 24. 

American theologian Jason Hood, writing in the Journal of Biblical Literature, argues that chapters 23 to 25 of the Gospel of Matthew form the fifth and final discourse in the gospel. In his reading, these three chapters together "uniquely infuse Jesus' distinctive teaching on discipleship, Christology, and judgment with the dramatic tension running throughout Matthew's plot".

Text 

The original text was written in Koine Greek. This chapter is divided into 46 verses.

Textual witnesses
Some early manuscripts containing the text of this chapter are:
Papyrus 45 (~AD 250; extant verses 41–46)
Papyrus 35 (3rd/4th century; extant verses 12–15, 20–23)
Codex Vaticanus (325–350)
Codex Sinaiticus (330–360)
Codex Bezae (~400)
Codex Washingtonianus (~400)
Codex Ephraemi Rescriptus (~450)
Codex Purpureus Rossanensis (6th century)
Codex Petropolitanus Purpureus (6th century; extant verses 7–34)
Codex Sinopensis (6th century; extant verses 1–18)
Papyrus 44 (6th/7th century; extant verses 8–10)

It is also found in quotations from Irenaeus (AD 180) in Adversus Haereses.

Content
This chapter includes the parable of the ten virgins (verses 1-13) and the parable of the talents or minas (verses 14-30), both unique to Matthew, followed by notice of "the great and universal judgment at the end of this period", with its parabolic references to a separation of peoples "as a shepherd separates the sheep from the goats" (verse 32). The final section (verses 31-46) is sometimes referred to as the "parable of the sheep and the goats".

Verse 14
Again, it will be like a man going on a journey, who called his servants and entrusted his wealth to them.
This verse begins a new parable, that of the talents or minas. There is no reference to the "kingdom of heaven" in this verse or in the parable, but the words, which mirror verse 1, are added in the King James Version and some other English translations "for the sake of grammatical completeness".

Uses

Music
"Matthew 25:21" is a song title inspired by this verse on the album The Life of the World to Come that was released by the American band The Mountain Goats in 2009.

See also
 Matthew 25: Ministries
 Mount of Olives
 Olivet Discourse
 Parables of Jesus

References

External links

 King James Bible - Wikisource
English Translation with Parallel Latin Vulgate
Online Bible at GospelHall.org (ESV, KJV, Darby, American Standard Version, Bible in Basic English)
Multiple bible versions at Bible Gateway (NKJV, NIV, NRSV etc.)

Gospel of Matthew chapters